Helen Lee (born 3 January 1943) is an Australian former cricketer. Lee played two Test matches for the Australia women's national cricket team. She was married to Ross Taylor, who played first-class cricket for New South Wales.

References

1943 births
Living people
Australia women Test cricketers